Rohan Taylor is the State Head Coach for swimming in Victoria and Tasmania. He was the performance coach of the Nunawading Swimming Club based in Melbourne, Australia.  He has previously coached at the Shoalhaven Academy, Carey Aquatic, Saddleback Valley Aquatics, Laguna Hills High School and Irvine Novaquatics. In September 2008 it was announced that he has been hired by the Nunawading Swimming Club as its new High Performance coach.

In 2007, Leisel Jones, who had won the 100 m and 200 m breaststroke at both the 2005 and 2007 World Championships, relocated to Melbourne for family reasons and began swimming under Taylor. She won the 100 m event at the 2008 Summer Olympics in Beijing.

Notes 

2020 Tokyo Head Coach of the Australian Olympic National Swimming Team – 9 Gold and 21 Total medals. Greatest result of any Olympic Swimming Team in History.

Sportspeople from Melbourne
Australian swimming coaches
Living people
Australian Olympic coaches
Year of birth missing (living people)